IE School of Global and Public Affairs (IEGPA) belongs to IE University, whose campuses are located in Madrid and Segovia, Spain.

IEGPA offers multiple programs in both English and Spanish which are compliant with the terms of the European Higher Education Area Bologna Accord.
IE School of Global and Public Affairs offers a Bachelor in International Relations, Bachelor in Economics, Master in International Relations, Master in International Development, Master in Applied Economics, as well as a series of dual degrees, at both the undergraduate and postgraduate levels.

IEGPA affiliated faculty publish research in political science, economics, and other social science fields, with particular focus on positive political theory and quantitative methods.

IE School of Global and Public Affairs is a Full Member of the Association of Professional Schools of International Affairs (APSIA), which serves as an active platform for the exchange of valuable expertise in the international arena.

References

IE University
Schools of international relations